Zlatolist Hill (‘Halm Zlatolist’ \'h&lm zla-to-'list\) is the ice-covered hill rising to 924 m in the north foothills of Detroit Plateau on Trinity Peninsula in Graham Land, Antarctica. It is surmounting Russell West Glacier to the north.

The hill is named after the settlements of Zlatolist in Southern and Southwestern Bulgaria.

Location
German-British mapping in 1996.

Maps
 Trinity Peninsula. Scale 1:250000 topographic map No. 5697. Institut für Angewandte Geodäsie and British Antarctic Survey, 1996.
 Antarctic Digital Database (ADD). Scale 1:250000 topographic map of Antarctica. Scientific Committee on Antarctic Research (SCAR), 1993–2016.

Notes

References
 Zlatolist Hill. SCAR Composite Antarctic Gazetteer
 Bulgarian Antarctic Gazetteer. Antarctic Place-names Commission. (details in Bulgarian, basic data in English)

External links
 Zlatolist Hill. Copernix satellite image

Hills of Trinity Peninsula
Bulgaria and the Antarctic